Meethari Marwar is  a village in Ladnun tehsil of Nagaur district in the Indian state of Rajasthan.

History 

The date of establishment, and information about founders of the village, are unclear. However, some evidence and historical accounts indicate that this area was settled about 1100–1150 AD, during the Rajput princely era. According to local evidence, there was a pond on the site long before the village was founded. The pond is known as Piparni Nadi or Pipaly Nadi and is regularly replenished with rainwater; so, it became a resting point on the route that was used between two principalities, Shekhawati and Marwar. Evidence shows that when traders, the army, banjaras, or others travelling along this way, they rested and took shelter here, because they always found sweet and clean drinking water for themselves and their animals. So, it was soon called Meethari. Because this was also the entrance to Marwar state, people started to call it Meethari Marwar.

Geography 

Meethari Marwar village is in Ladnun tehsil of Nagaur district in Rajasthan state.

The village experiences Thar Desert regional climate.

The main plants and trees are Acacia senegal and Acacia leucophloea, the Khejari Prosopis cineraria, Kankera, Rohida (the state flower of Rajasthan), Kair, Khair, etc., with some big trees such as Peepal, Bargad, Neem, Sheesam, Saresh. Despite large-scale forest clearances, a few mammals, such as foxes and jackals, still remain. The forested part of the village is home to other wild animals, such as big cats, mice, geckos, monitor lizards, and other reptiles, such as the king cobra, viper, and chameleon.

Demographics 

According to the 2001 Indian census, the population of Meethari Marwar village is as follows:
Total Population – 3236 Persons
Total Male Population – 1623 Male
Total Female Population – 1613 Female
Scheduled castes population – Persons 1,095
Scheduled castes population – Male
Scheduled castes population – Females 544
Scheduled tribes population – Persons 55
Scheduled tribes population – Males 28
Scheduled tribes population – Females 27

Meethari Marwar is a representative village of the traditional Rajasthani social and cultural rural environment.

There are mainly two communities—Hindu and Muslim—who live together in communal harmony. Hindu castes such as Agarwal, Brahmins, Jats, Rajput, Meghwal, Goldsmith, Suthar, potters, and Meena live here. There are some Muslim clans in the village, such as the Qaimkhani, Chhinpa, and Maniyars.

Almost all Hindu families worship the regional folk gods and goddesses, which is the usual practice in village life in Rajasthan. Gogaji, the god of snakes, is the most recognized folk god. Traditional Rajasthani villages have Gogaji dwelling worship palaces that are generally referred to as Goga Meri. Tejaji, Pabuji, Durga mother, Rajalbai, Shyam Ji, Thakur ji, Balaji, Shiv Darbar, Bhomiaji, and Bharavji are also some of the local deities the are worshiped in the village.

Economy 

Almost 60 percent of the village's population depends on agriculture for their livelihood. All fields are small holdings and farming is entirely dependent on  monsoon rains.

Many villagers have served and are currently serving in various branches of the Indian army, air force, and navy; in rural, state, and federal civil government; as well as there being teachers, bankers, etc.

The Agarwal caste is representative of the merchants in the village and were the highest caste; but they are slowly moving to other areas of the country, such as Mumbai, Surat, Silwasa, Asam, Bengal, Nagaland, and Hyedrabad. The Qaimkhani clan have served in various branches of the Indian army.

Some castes, such as goldsmiths, Suthar, potters, etc., still work in their traditional roles; but they very small in number.

Government and politics 
The village is a Gram Panchayat under Panchayat Samitee Ladnu. The Gram Panchayat is divided into 12 wards. Every five years the entire panchayat sarpanch is up for election, along with the heads, or panchon, of the 12 wards. In the 2020 panchayat election, Laxmi Devi Bajari was elected the village sarpanch.

Public facilities 

The village has many public facilities.

Educational institutions:
Rural Public Senior Secondary School
Government Senior Secondary School
Government Girls Secondary School (upgraded in August 2013)
Government Upper Primary School
Government Primary School No. 1
Government Primary School No. 2 (Indira colony)
Madarsa Islamiyan (K.K. Colony)
Prince School (Lachhari Road, Rajput Colony)

Hospitals and clinics:
Government Community Health Center
Government Veterinary Hospital

Community halls and cultural centers:
Jat Society Hall
Parshuram Bhawan
Bharech Bhawan
Meghwal Dharma Shala
Community Hall (Didwana Road)
Bharat Nirman Rajiv Gandhi Sewa Kendra (Didwana Road)
Shree Balaji Gau Seva Samiti Trust

Water distribution and management:

The level of underground water is very deep, 300 to 350 feet. Due to its increased salinity, it is unsuitable for agricultural or human consumption. Water is supplied from nearby Nechhwa town, via a tubewells system, as well as rain water harvesting for drinking water.

Integrated Watershed Management Programme (IWMP):

Since financial year 2011–15, the village's total arable land (1035 ha) has been placed under the Integrated Watershed Management Programme (IWMP), which is the erstwhile Drought Prone Areas Programme (DPAP) modified. The village is also a part of the Desert Development Programme (DDP) and Integrated Wastelands Development Programme (IWDP) of the Department of Land Resources.

References

External links 
 Position of Meethari Marwar in Nagaur District Map
 Polling Station in Nagaur District
 IWMP Programming in Meethari Marwar
 Nagaur District Live News
 Population Of Meethari Marwar
 List of elected Surpunch's in Panchayat Election 2010
 The list of all villages of Rajasthan according to their Panchayat Summities
 Meethari Marwar on Stad.com

Villages in Nagaur district